The  or  was a board of five senior magistrates of the Republic of Venice, initially charged with the defence of the Republic's possessions in the Italian mainland.

Establishment
The  were established , as part of the Republic's expansion into the Veneto and Lombardy, and its military confrontation with the Duchy of Milan over hegemony in northern Italy. They were probably the direct descendants of the extraordinary  that were elected in 1412 for the pursuit of the war. In 1432, the  became  members of the Venetian Senate.

Composition
They were five in number, and sat on the Full College , the Republic's effective cabinet. As with other higher magistracies of Venice, restrictions were placed on the eligibility to the office: the members were elected from the Venetian Senate, served a term of six months, and could not be re-elected to the same office for three months thereafter.

Roles
Like all , the office did not carry a salary, but could be held in tandem with other public offices.
The post existed since at least 1519, and initially tasked with the payment of military salaries, but by the mid-17th century its powers had been extended to encompass all areas of military administration, apart from the supervision of the militias and those matters under the purview of  military committees staffed by patricians holding military commands, to which he acted in an advisory capacity.
The post existed as early as 1473, but appears to have lapsed and not revived until 1526, and abolished again in 1539–1543. His tenure lasted for a year (after 1543 limited to six months), but all affairs begun under his tenure remained under his purview until completed, even after leaving office.
Unlike the previous two posts, there was no election specifically on this position, which was given to the one of the three remaining  with the highest number of votes.

References

Sources
 
 
 
 

Domini di Terraferma
Government of the Republic of Venice
15th-century establishments in the Republic of Venice
Military history of the Republic of Venice